The Pure Silk Championship was a women's professional golf tournament on the LPGA Tour, played in Williamsburg, Virginia.

Previously known as the "Michelob ULTRA Open at Kingsmill," the tournament was founded  in 2003 and played for seven seasons. Absent in 2010 and 2011, it returned for the 2012 season in early September, and switched to early May in 2013.

The LPGA event succeeded the Michelob Championship at Kingsmill, an annual PGA Tour event held for 22 years, from 1981 through 2002.

Michelob ULTRA Open
Held at the Kingsmill Resort just south of Williamsburg, it formerly had one of the highest purses on the LPGA Tour, which attracted a very competitive field.  It was voted the players' favorite stop on the tour in 2007 and fans' favorite tournament in 2008.

With a purse of $2.2 million, the winner of this LPGA tournament automatically qualified for the season-ending LPGA Playoffs at The ADT, during the years the Playoffs were held, from 2006 through 2008. The purse for the revived event in 2012 was $1.3 million. 

The tournament was sponsored by Michelob ULTRA beer, and its parent company Anheuser-Busch. As of 2007, Anheuser-Busch had donated over $1.3 million to 30 different charities through the event. At the 2009 tournament, there was speculation that Anheuser-Busch would not continue its sponsorship; the late-2000s recession and the company's pending acquisition by InBev were among the factors.

The talk led that year's winner, Cristie Kerr, and other players to lobby to keep the tournament. In September 2009, Anheuser-Busch announced the discontinuation of its sponsorship of the event, and the LPGA Tour lost one of its most prominent stops.

The decision came at a difficult time for the LPGA, which lost a number of events during 2008 and 2009.

Kingsmill Championship

At the 2012 event, Jiyai Shin won a sudden-death playoff with Paula Creamer that extended to nine holes and a fifth day.  After eight consecutive pars by both, all played on the par-4 18th hole, darkness forced the playoff's suspension until Monday morning. Play was restarted on the 16th hole, and Creamer bogeyed with three putts while Shin parred. Both were a day late arriving to the Women's British Open in England; Shin won the year's final major by nine strokes and Creamer finished third.  

Kerr won her third title at Kingsmill in a playoff in 2013 over Suzann Pettersen, the 2007 champion. The playoff went two holes, both played on #18, and ended when Kerr sank her putt for par. The sudden-death format was changed in 2013 to play that finishing hole three times, then move to over to #16 if a fourth hole was necessary. 

Kerr is the only multiple winner, with victories in 2005, 2009, and 2013. Annika Sörenstam set the event's 72-hole scoring record in 2008 at 265, 19 strokes under par. Shin set the stop's single round record in 2012, with a 62 (−9) in the first round.

Tournament names
2003: Michelob Light Open at Kingsmill
2004–2009: Michelob ULTRA Open at Kingsmill
2012–2017: Kingsmill Championship
2018: Kingsmill Championship presented by GEICO
2019–2021: Pure Silk Championship presented by Visit Williamsburg

Course
River Course in 2013

Opened  in 1975, the River Course was designed by noted course architect Pete Dye, who also supervised its renovation in 2004.

Winners

^ Play extended one day due to rain delays.

Tournament record

* Tournament winner

References

External links

Coverage on the LPGA Tour's official site
Kingsmill Resort – LPGA event

Former LPGA Tour events
Golf in Virginia
Sports in Hampton Roads
Recurring sporting events established in 2003
Recurring sporting events disestablished in 2021
2003 establishments in Virginia
2021 disestablishments in Virginia